Meitei people, being the predominant ethnic group in the Himalayan kingdom of Manipur, has diverse cultural contacts with diverse communities of other nations since ancient times. The case is the same with Meitei folklore as well as Meitei culture. This is a list of the creatures of Ancient Meetei folklore. 
This doesn't include the list of deities in Meitei mythology, for which see Lists of deities in Sanamahism and Meitei deities.

Mythological Animals

Dragons

Evil Creatures

Uchek Langmeidong

The Uchek Langmeidong (Meitei: ꯎꯆꯦꯛ ꯂꯥꯡꯃꯩꯗꯣꯡ) or Chareng (Meitei: ꯆꯔꯦꯡ), literary meaning "hornbill", is a mythical creature in Meitei mythology. It appears in the form of a hornbill bird, who was originally a human girl.

The creature was originally a little girl who, unable to bear the constant torture of her stepmother in the absence of her father, sought feathers from her hornbill friends, and turned herself into a bird by wearing the woven feathers.

List
Here's a list of mythical creatures in alphabetical order:

 Kanglasha
 Nongshaba
 Pakhangba
 Poubi Lai
 Uchek Langmeidong

References 

Folklore
Meitei